International Insurance Co. v. Duryee, 96 F.3d 837 (6th Cir. 1996), was a case decided by the United States Court of Appeals for the Sixth Circuit that held unconstitutional a statute enacted by the Ohio legislature that sought to discourage removal jurisdiction.

Decision
To limit removal jurisdiction pursuant to 28 U.S.C. §1441, the Ohio legislature enacted a statute that barred any out-of-state insurance company from doing business in the state for three years if the insurer removed a case to federal court.  The Sixth Circuit held that the statute was unconstitutional.

References

External links

United States Court of Appeals for the Sixth Circuit cases
United States federal jurisdiction case law
1996 in United States case law